The Corydon Democrat is in Corydon, Indiana, Harrison County, United States of America and has approximately 6,250 copies in circulation. This community newspaper is published every Wednesday by the O’Bannon Publishing Company, family owned since 1963. Frank O'Bannon served as the 47th Governor of Indiana and worked for this family newspaper, the Corydon Democrat. He also served the Corydon community as chairman of the O’Bannon Publishing Company before taking the political stage. The Corydon Democrat is in Indiana’s first state capitol. According to Outdoor Indiana, “The Battle of Corydon” was the only Civil War Battle fought on Indiana soil. It was reported by editor Simeon K. Wolfe in the July 14, 1863 edition of the Corydon Weekly Democrat. The Corydon Democrat holds the historical record for the Harrison County Fair, specified by the Harrison County Fair Office. This fair has been held for over 150 years, since 1860, making it the oldest county fair in the state of Indiana to be continuously held in the same location, the Harrison County Fairgrounds.

Awards

The newspaper is a sixteen time "Blue Ribbon Award" winner in editing by the Hoosier State Press Association in the non-daily division. This award evaluates the overall editorial quality of the newspaper.

 2015
 2012
 2000
 1998
 1996
 1994
 1991
 1990
 1989
 1988
 1985
 1980
 1979
 1977
 1976
 1975

References

Newspapers published in Indiana